The International Public Debate Association (IPDA), inaugurated on 15 February 1997 at St. Mary's University, Texas in San Antonio by Alan Cirlin, Jack Rogers, and Trey Gibson, is a national debate league currently active in the states of Arkansas, Louisiana, Missouri, Kansas, Alabama, California, Texas, Mississippi, Tennessee, Washington, Oregon, Idaho, Florida, Georgia, and Oklahoma.  The IPDA promotes a debate format that emphasizes public speaking and real-world persuasion skills over the use of evidence and speed. To ad onto this, the IPDA predominantly uses lay judges in order to encourage an audience-centered debate style. While most member programs within the International Public Debate Association are associated with colleges or universities, participation in IPDA tournaments is open to anyone whose education level is equivalent to secondary school or higher.

References

External links
http://www.ipdadebate.info/

Student debating societies